Pachiyur is a village in the Orathanadu taluk of Thanjavur district, Tamil Nadu, India.

Demographics 

As per the 2001 census, Pachiyur had a total population of 1340 with 664 males and 676 females. The sex ratio was 1018. The literacy rate was 64.59.

References 

 

Villages in Thanjavur district